Samuel Eddy (March 31, 1769February 3, 1839) was a U.S. Representative from Rhode Island.  Born Johnston in the Colony of Rhode Island and Providence Plantations, Eddy completed preparatory studies.  He graduated from Brown University in 1787.  He studied law, was admitted to the bar in 1790 and practiced a short time in Providence. He served as clerk of the Rhode Island Supreme Court from 1790 to 1793. He also served as Rhode Island Secretary of State from 1798 to 1819.

Eddy was elected as Democratic-Republican to the Sixteenth and Seventeenth Congresses, and reelected as an Adams-Clay Republican to the Eighteenth Congress (March 4, 1819 – March 3, 1825).  He was an unsuccessful candidate for reelection in 1824 to the Nineteenth Congress and for election in 1828 to the Twenty-first Congress.  He served as associate justice of the Rhode Island Supreme Court in 1826 and 1827, and served as chief justice 1827 to 1835. Eddy wrote the Court's first published decision, Stoddard v. Martin in 1828.  Eddy died in Providence, Rhode Island, February 3, 1839, and was interred in North Burial Ground.

He was elected a member of the American Antiquarian Society in 1819.

References

Sources

1769 births
1839 deaths
Brown University alumni
Chief Justices of the Rhode Island Supreme Court
Secretaries of State of Rhode Island
Rhode Island National Republicans
Democratic-Republican Party members of the United States House of Representatives from Rhode Island
Members of the American Antiquarian Society
People of colonial Rhode Island
Burials at North Burying Ground (Providence)